Dominic Barton (born 1962), known as Bao Damin in China, is a Ugandan-born Canadian business executive, author, and diplomat. He is the current chairman of the private investment firm LeapFrog Investments as well as the chancellor of the University of Waterloo. He served as the Canadian Ambassador to the People's Republic of China from 2019-2021. Prior to this, Barton was the Global Managing Director of McKinsey & Company, the global consulting firm, from 2009 to 2018 and has previously served as Chairman of Teck Resources and as Non-Executive Director at the Singtel Group in Singapore and Investor AB in Sweden.

In April 2022 Barton was appointed as Chairman of the Management Board of LeapFrog Investments, a private investment firm that invests in high-growth, emerging markets, with a focus on social and environmental impact.

Barton became the Chairman of the Board of Directors of Rio Tinto, the world's second largest metals and mining corporation, on May 5, 2022. In October 2022 the Eurasia Group announced the appointment of Barton as a Strategic Counselor.

Barton earned his Master of Philosophy in Economics at Oxford University, where he studied as a Rhodes Scholar and has advised Canadian governments, both Liberal and Conservative, on public sector transformation and economic growth.

Early life and education
Dominic Barton was born in Mukono, Uganda in 1962. Barton's father was an Anglican missionary who helped develop a theology college in Uganda; his mother was a nurse. In his childhood, his family's house was occupied by general and future dictator Idi Amin, who was rising to power in Uganda at the time. At age seven his family moved from Uganda to Canada, eventually settling in the community of Sardis, British Columbia.

Barton attended the University of British Columbia, where he earned a Bachelor's degree in Economics. He was awarded a Rhodes Scholarship and attended Brasenose College at Oxford University, where he received an MPhil degree in Economics.

Career
After graduating, Barton worked briefly as a currency analyst for N M Rothschild & Sons in London. In 1986 he was hired by McKinsey & Company to work in the company's Toronto office and worked from that office as a management consultant for eleven years.  

Barton was elected to the position of Global Managing Director, a role that he served in from 2009 to 2018. After this role, Barton became Global Managing Director Emeritus for a year while accepting a broader range of philanthropic and advisory positions. From 2018 to 2019 he was chairman of natural resources giant Teck, one of the largest exporters of steel-making coal in the world. One employee resigned from McKinsey because of the increased work McKinsey did with Teck in that year, including projects titled “Coal Processing Optimization" and "Drill and Blast. On September 5, 2019, he was appointed as the Canadian Ambassador to the People’s Republic of China.

Work in Asia 
In 1997 Barton moved to the McKinsey office in Seoul, where he eventually led McKinsey's national practice. During Barton's tenure in South Korea, McKinsey worked with the South Korean government to restructure the country's financial system aiming to foster a 'creative economy'.

He was Chairman for McKinsey in Asia from 2004 to 2009, operating out of Shanghai. He co-authored a book that provided insights into ordinary Chinese citizens and their way of life, China Vignettes – An Inside Look At China.

He has been an adjunct professor at Beijing's Tsinghua University and served on the School of Economics and Management's advisory board. Barton also chaired the Seoul International Business Advisory Council for six years and was a member of the Singapore Economic Development Board's International Advisory Council for ten years.

Advisory Council on Public Service 
Barton served on the Canadian Advisory Committee on the Public Service under former Prime Minister Stephen Harper. Barton was one of several Canadian business leaders that advised the Prime Minister on the renewal and development of the country's public service.

Advisory Council on Economic Growth 
Barton served as chair of the Advisory Council on Economic Growth, the Canadian federal government's blue-chip panel, starting in 2017. The council outlined 13 recommendations, including the creation of the Canada Infrastructure Bank, the launch of a re-skilling program for the Canadian workforce, the formulation of growth strategies for sectors with untapped potential, including agriculture, and the development of the Invest in Canada hub.

The Council set a goal of lifting "the median household's income to $105,000 in 2030". It was about $80,000 in 2017. The Council also called for a gradual increase in permanent immigration to Canada to 450,000 people a year.

Barton is also a co-founder of the Century Initiative, an organization dedicated to growing Canada's population to 100 million by 2100.

Managing Director 
In July 2009 he was elected to the position of Global Managing Director of McKinsey & Company, based on a vote of 400 senior partners. He was re-elected to a second three-year term in 2012 and a third term in 2015, serving the maximum three terms at the head of the global firm. He was replaced by Kevin Sneader in 2018.

McKinsey was ranked as the number one consulting firm in the world for nine consecutive years during Barton’s leadership. In 2013 and 2016 Glassdoor ranked Barton as one of the top CEOs globally, based on employee choice.

During Barton's time as Global Managing Director of McKinsey & Co between 2009 and 2018, the firm was embroiled in several scandals, e.g. -  South Africa, Valeant,  Insider trading by its investment affiliate, and association with several authoritarian regimes around the world. Since leaving McKinsey & Co, the firm has faced scrutiny over work McKinsey did for Purdue Pharma to improve its opioid sales, which contributed to the opioid epidemic.

Academia 

On the 19th of June, 2018, Barton was named the 11th chancellor of the University of Waterloo. Barton was reappointed as chancellor on the 25th of February 2021.

Previously he has served as a Co-Chair on the Max Bell School of Public Policy Advisory Board at McGill University and on the Cabinet of the University of Toronto Psychiatry Campaign.

Ambassador of Canada to China 

On 4 September 2019, Barton was appointed to be Ambassador to China by the Government of Canada. The appointment was met with a mixed reaction, including scrutiny around Barton's past ties with China while proponents of the appointment argued that Barton's Asian and Chinese experience made him a uniquely qualified selection.  

After taking on the role, Barton led Canada’s efforts to win the release of Michael Kovrig and Michael Spavor, two Canadians who were imprisoned in China in December, 2018, in a move widely seen as retaliation for the arrest of Huawei executive Meng Wanzhou. Throughout their detention, Barton conducted regular consular visits with Kovrig and Spavor respectively, often delivering coded messages to avoid interception from eavesdropping prison guards.

The Toronto Star also reported that Barton’s work on this file pre-dated his appointment as Ambassador, as his network and understanding of the relevant stakeholders helped pave the way for open communication channels between Chinese, Canadian, and U.S. officials. All three countries had “red lines” and Barton played a leading role finding a “pathway” that would ultimately lead to their release. 

In April 2021, this included meetings in Washington where Barton received a commitment from senior U.S. officials to put intensity into their pressure on Beijing. The Wall Street Journal also reported that Barton maintained a line of communications with Xie Feng, China's Vice Foreign Minister, to coordinate the logistics of an eventual resolution that would bring the prisoner standoff to an end.

On September 24, 2021, Kovrig and Spavor were released from detention in China and boarded a plane with Barton to Anchorage, Calgary, and Toronto. It was reported by Canadian media that this flight followed weeks of consecutive meetings held with Barton and Chinese officials as part of a “highly choreographed” effort.

Barton was personally thanked by Prime Minister Justin Trudeau for his role in securing the release of the two men.

On December 6, 2021, it was announced that Barton would step down from the role after completing the “core mission” that he had been appointed to achieve: securing the release of Kovrig and Spavor.

Writing 
Barton is the author of China Vignettes: An Inside Look At China. Barton led a research team that conducted interviews with ordinary Chinese citizens and captures his findings with a series of short stories about daily life. Barton is the co-author of Dangerous Markets: Managing in Financial Crises. This book lays out a plan for global business leaders to manage their organizations through hazardous economic environments, providing advice to executives on how to navigate increasingly volatile financial markets. He also co-authored Re-Imagining Capitalism, which looks at capitalism through a contemporary lens and ponders how the economic system might be adapted to modern times. The book argues that the focus of capitalism should be expanded and adapted to focus more on long-termism. Re-Imagining Capitalism builds on Barton’s previous writing, which reflects on the 2008 economic crisis, rejecting the “false choice” between serving stakeholders and shareholders while advocating for long-term planning from business leaders.

Most recently, Barton co-authored Talent Wins: The New Playbook for Putting People First, which argues that the primary driver of long-term success in companies is talent. The book maintains that business executives and leaders need to develop and manage their human capital even more intensely than they do their financial capital.

Board and advisory positions 
Barton has been a member of multiple boards like the Singapore Economic Development Board’s International Advisory Council and worked as an advisor to the Asian Development Bank. Barton also sits on the steering committee of the China–United States Exchange Foundation.

In December 2021 it was announced that Barton would become the new chairman of Rio Tinto, effective in May 2022. He will join the company's board in April 2022.

In April 2022 Barton was also appointed as Chairman of the Management Board of Leapfrog Investments, a private investment firm that invests in high-growth, emerging markets, with a focus on social and environmental impact.

In October 2022 the Eurasia Group, a global political risk consultancy, announced that Barton was joining the firm as a Strategic Counselor. Eurasia Group cited Barton’s extensive business and diplomatic acumen as reasons for the appointment.

Honors, awards, and civic and philanthropic activities 

Barton has served on the board of the Malala Fund, a global organization dedicated to helping young girls in the developing world gain access to education founded by Pakistani human rights activist Malala Yousafzai.

Barton was also involved in the United Nations HeForShe initiative, a campaign focused on advancing global gender equality.

In 2010, Barton was made an honorary fellow of Brasenose College, Oxford. He also sat on the board of the University of Oxford Saïd Business School.

Barton is a member of the Rhodes Trust Founder’s Circle and was a trustee of the Brookings Institution.

He was director at the Asia Pacific Foundation of Canada and chair of Canadian mining company Teck Resources.

He was a Commissioner for the Global Commission on Internet Governance. He was a member of the International Advisory Board at the University of Oxford Blavatnik School of Government and of the Board of Trustees of Saudi Arabia's King Abdullah University of Science and Technology.

He has received the INSEAD Business Leader for the World Award in 2011, the Korean order of Civil Merit in 2013, the Singaporean Public Service Star in 2014, the Foreign Policy Association Corporate Social Responsibility Award in 2017 and Canada's Public Policy Forum Testimonial Award in 2017.

Personal life
Barton, whose principal residence is in Beijing, was married to Canadian-born glass artist and scion of the Canadian beer family and former securities lawyer, Sheila Labatt. He has two children from this marriage. He divorced in 2014, later marrying Geraldine Buckingham, an Australian who was formerly Blackrock's Asia Pacific Chairman. Barton and Buckingham have two children together.

Bibliography

See also
 List of University of Waterloo people

References

External links
 McKinsey bio
 Profile of Barton

Canadian management consultants
Living people
McKinsey & Company people
1962 births
Vancouver School of Economics alumni
Canadian Rhodes Scholars
Alumni of Brasenose College, Oxford
Canadian expatriates in the United Kingdom
People from Kampala
N M Rothschild & Sons people
Rhodes Trustees
Ambassadors of Canada to China